The Monastery of Iviron is an Eastern Orthodox monastery in the monastic community of Mount Athos in northern Greece.

History
The monastery was built under the supervision of two Georgian monks, John the Iberian and Tornike Eristavi between AD 980–83 and housed Georgian clergy and priests. It was founded on the site of the former Monastery of Clement. John the Iberian was appointed as the abbot of the newly founded monastery in 980. In 1005, Euthymius the Iberian became the secondary abbot of Iviron Monastery. In Greek, Iviron literally means "of the Iberians". The monastery ranks third in the Athonite hierarchy of 20 sovereign monasteries.

Notable people 
Tornike Eristavi (died 985)
John the Iberian (died c. 1002)
Euthymius of Athos (c. 955-1028)
George the Hagiorite (1009-1065)

Gallery

References

External links 

 Official website
 Iviron monastery at the Mount Athos website

 
Christian monasteries established in the 10th century
Monasteries on Mount Athos
Georgia (country)–Greece relations
Greek Orthodox monasteries